Colonel Newcome (or Colonel Newcome, the Perfect Gentleman) is a 1920 British silent historical drama film directed by Fred Goodwins and starring Milton Rosmer, Joyce Carey and Temple Bell. It was based on the 1854-55 novel The Newcomes by William Makepeace Thackeray.

Cast
 Milton Rosmer – B. Newcombe 
 Joyce Carey – Rose 
 Temple Bell – Ethel Newcome 
 Louis Willoughby – Newcombe 
 Dame May Whitty – Mrs. Mackenzie 
 Fred Morgan – Baynham 
 Haidee Wright – Lady Newcome 
 Bobby Andrews – C. Newcombe 
 Norma Whalley – Lady Clare

References

External links

1920 films
British historical drama films
1920s historical drama films
Films directed by Fred Goodwins
Films based on British novels
Ideal Film Company films
Films set in England
British silent feature films
British black-and-white films
1920 drama films
Films based on works by William Makepeace Thackeray
1920s English-language films
1920s British films
Silent historical drama films